Brinkley is a hamlet in Nottinghamshire, England. It is located 1 mile south-east of Southwell, and is within the Southwell civil parish.

External links

Hamlets in Nottinghamshire
Southwell, Nottinghamshire
Newark and Sherwood